Liam Sutcliffe (born 25 November 1994) is an English professional rugby league footballer who plays in a variety of positions for the Hull FC in the Betfred Super League and England and the England Knights at international level.

Sutcliffe has spent time on loan from Leeds at the Bradford Bulls in the Super League, and Featherstone Rovers in the Betfred Championship.

Background
Sutcliffe was born in Wakefield, West Yorkshire, England.

He is not related to fellow Rhino Alex Sutcliffe.

Career

Leeds Rhinos
Sutcliffe featured in the pre-season friendly against Wakefield Trinity in the annual Boxing Day Festive Challenge. He made his début against St. Helens, and went on to play in the playoffs due to more injuries towards the end of the season. In his début season he went on to make 18 appearances and scored seven tries.

In 2014 Sutcliffe featured in Round 1 and played in the 2014 Challenge Cup Final victory over the Castleford Tigers at Wembley Stadium.
In his second season, he played 25 games and scored 10 tries and he also kicked 8 goals.

Sutcliffe featured in more games in 2015. He started games after captain Kevin Sinfield was injured and proved he could score and kick goals which kept Sinfield out of the starting 13. Unfortunate Sutcliffe had an anterior cruciate ligament (ACL) knee injury which ruled him out for the remainder of the season which meant he missed the Challenge Cup Final and Grand Final. He played 15 games scoring 6 times and kicking 25 goals.  After Sinfield retired at the end of 2015 Sutcliffe was promoted to the starting 13 and was given the number 14 shirt. He also played in the World Club Series against North Queensland Cowboys.

He played in the 2017 Super League Grand Final victory over the Castleford Tigers at Old Trafford.

On 17 October 2020, he played in the 2020 Challenge Cup Final victory for Leeds over Salford at Wembley Stadium.
In the 2022 elimination playoff, Sutcliffe scored a hat-trick in Leeds shock 20-10 victory over Catalans Dragons.
On 24 September 2022, Sutcliffe played for Leeds in their 24-12 loss to St Helens RFC in the 2022 Super League Grand Final.

Bradford Bulls
In 2014 Sutcliffe was sent out on loan to the struggling Bradford Bulls on a one-month loan playing 4 games and scoring once before they were relegated.

International career
In 2018 he was selected for England against France at the Leigh Sports Village.

In 2018 he was selected for the England Knights on their tour of Papua New Guinea. He played against Papua New Guinea at the Lae Football Stadium.

Statistics

Honours
Super League: 2017
Challenge Cup: 2014 2020

References

External links
Leeds Rhinos profile
SL profile

1994 births
Living people
Bradford Bulls players
England Knights national rugby league team players
England national rugby league team players
English rugby league players
Featherstone Rovers players
Hull F.C. players
Leeds Rhinos players
Rugby league locks
Rugby league players from Leeds